This is a list of railway stations in Wales, one of the four countries of the United Kingdom. It includes all railway stations in Wales that form part of the British National Rail network that currently have timetabled train services. It does not include stations on heritage railways, except for those shared with the National Rail network.

The main operator is Transport for Wales who run almost all services in Wales. However Great Western Railway operates the South Wales-London service, CrossCountry operates long-distance services to Central and North East England from Cardiff Central and Newport, and Avanti West Coast run from North Wales-West Midlands-London.

The main rail routes in Wales include:
London–South Wales
Cardiff–Newport–Wrexham–Holyhead/Manchester
Valley Lines urban network
London–Holyhead/Bangor/Wrexham

The table includes, where known, the year that each station was opened. Detailed records are not always available, and some stations, particularly in the South Wales Valleys area, were operated as halts for workmen, and public services only appeared later. Additionally, some station names have appeared with several variations, often changing from English to Welsh or vice versa.

The station usage 2007/08 shows that 40,118,437 rail journeys begun and/or finished in Wales that year compared with 36,466,308 the previous year, a rise of 10%.

Stations 
The following table lists the name of each station in English and Welsh, along with the year it first opened, and the unitary authority area in which it is situated. The table also shows the train operators who currently serve each station and the final two columns give information on the number of passengers using each station in recent years, as collated by the Office of Rail Regulation, a Government body. The figures are based on ticket sales and are given to the nearest 100.

Gallery

See also 
 List of railway stations in Cardiff
 List of Valley Lines stations
 Transport in Wales

Footnotes 
 Aber opened in 1908 as Beddau Halt. It was renamed in 1926 as Aber Junction Halt, then in 1968 renamed as Aber Halt. It gained its current name in 1969, after a station in Gwynedd named Aber had been closed in 1960.
 Abercynon opened in 1840 as Navigation House. It was renamed in 1846 as Aberdare Junction, then in 1896 was renamed as Abercynon. It was renamed Abercynon South in 1988, upon the opening of Abercynon North. It reverted to Abercynon in 2008 upon the closure of Abercynon North.
 Abererch was renamed in 1956 as Abererch Halt. The name was changed back in 1968. The station closed in 1994, although it has since reopened.
 Abergavenny was renamed in 1950 as Abergavenny Monmouth Road. The name was changed back in 1968.
 Aberystwyth is also served by the Vale of Rheidol Railway, a narrow-gauge heritage railway.
 Ammanford opened in 1841 as Duffryn. It was renamed in 1889 as Tirydail, and gained its current name in 1960.
 Barry Island is also served by the Barry Island Railway, a standard-gauge heritage railway, also known as the Vale of Glamorgan Railway.
 The present station at Blaenau Ffestiniog was opened in 1982, on the site of the 1882 Great Western Railway station from where trains ran to Bala. This line closed in 1961. The London & North Western Railway line from Llandudno originally terminated to the North of the present location, having reached the town in 1879. The present station is also served by the Ffestiniog Railway, a narrow-gauge heritage railway.
 Coryton was relocated in 1931. 
 Fairbourne is also served by the nearby Fairbourne Railway, a narrow-gauge heritage railway.
 Fishguard Harbour is unusual in that it is not owned by Network Rail, but is privately owned by the ferry operator Stena Line, who operate between Fishguard and Rosslare Europort.
 The first station at Holyhead was opened by the Chester and Holyhead Railway in 1848 but this was replaced by the second in 1851. The present station was opened by the London & North Western Railway in 1880.
 Llandudno Junction was opened in 1858 on a site slightly to the West of its present location. The station moved to the present site in 1897 in order to allow room for expansion.
 Although Llanfairpwll is famous for having the longest station name in Britain, Llanfairpwllgwyngyllgogerychwyrndrobwllllantysiliogogogoch, this is only used unofficially. The longest officially used station name on Britain's railway network is in fact Rhoose Cardiff International Airport, in South Wales.
 In 1853 a station called Merthyr High Street was first opened on the present day site of Merthyr Tydfil. It was rebuilt on part of the original site in 1974 and again in 1996.
 Minffordd is also served by the Ffestiniog Railway, a narrow-gauge heritage railway.
 Porthmadog is also served by the Ffestiniog Railway, and the Welsh Highland Railway, both narrow-gauge heritage railways.
 Tywyn is also served by the Talyllyn Railway, a narrow-gauge heritage railway.
 Although the English spelling for the area served is Llandaff, the station uses the Welsh spelling Llandaf

References

External links 

Wales
List of railway stations
Railway stations
Railway stations